Heteropneustes is a genus of catfishes, the airsac catfishes, native to Asia. This genus is monotypic in the family Heteropneustidae.

Their bodies are elongated and compressed with greatly depressed heads. They have long air sacs that serve as lungs that extend from the gill chamber. Their dorsal fins are short and have no spine. Their pectoral fins have an associated venom gland, so the fish are considered dangerous. They are oviparous; distinct pairing is possible.

Species 
Up to six species in this genus are recognized:
 Heteropneustes fossilis (Bloch, 1794) (stinging catfish)
 Heteropneustes fuscus Plamoottil, 2021 (Travancore black stinging catfish)
 Heteropneustes kemratensis (Fowler, 1937)
 Heteropneustes longipectoralis Rema Devi & Raghunathan, 1999
 Heteropneustes nani Hossain, Sarker, Sharifuzzaman & Chowdhury, 2013
 Heteropneustes microps (Günther, 1864)

FishBase does not list H. fuscus while the Catalog of Fishes considers H. microps a synonym of H. fossilis.

References

 
Catfish genera
Freshwater fish genera
Freshwater fish of South Asia
Taxa named by Johannes Peter Müller
Taxonomy articles created by Polbot